Heap Glacier is a glacier 10km (19 miles) long flowing northeastward to Mulock Glacier, to the east of Henry Mesa in Antarctica. It was mapped by the United States Geological Survey from tellurometer surveys and Navy air photos, 1959–63, and was named by the Advisory Committee on Antarctic Names for John A. Heap, a member of the University of Michigan Ross Ice Shelf Studies party, 1962–63.

References

Glaciers of Oates Land